Albacete-Los Llanos railway station is a railway station serving the Spanish city of Albacete, Castilla–La Mancha.

History
The station was opened in 2010 replacing an older station in the city, ready for service on the AVE high-speed rail line from Madrid Atocha, which was later extended to Alicante in 2013.

Facilities
Albacete-Los Llanos was designed to provide a centre for leisure, commerce and culture. Outlets in the station complex include McDonald's, a Mercadona supermarket, a Viaje El Corte Inglés department store, Juguetilandia toy store, cinema and McFit gym.

Services

Albacete-Los Llanos is served by various rail services; AVE high-speed rail via the Madrid–Levante high-speed rail network's Alicante branch, Alvia and Altaria mixed high-speed/conventional services to northern Spain and Murcia/Cartagena and regional trains serving destinations in Castilla–La Mancha.

References

Railway stations in Castilla–La Mancha
Buildings and structures in Albacete
Railway stations in Spain opened in 2010